The 2011 Lichfield District Council election took place on 5 May 2011 to elect members of Lichfield District Council in Staffordshire, England. The whole council - 56 members - was up for election and the Conservative Party retained overall control of the council.

Campaign
Labour, Conservative, Liberal Democrats, Independent and Independent Labour candidates stood in the election. The wards elected from one to three members of the council depending on the electorate's size. candidates in  wards were elected unopposed.

Election result
The Conservatives maintained control of the council. They gained 2 seats and Labour gained 5. The Liberal Democrats and the two Independent councillors were eliminated from the council and no other party is represented.

Results by ward
Elected candidates in bold: defending candidates marked with "*".

This poll was uncontested

This poll was uncontested	

This poll was uncontested

This poll was uncontested

References

2011 English local elections
2011
2010s in Staffordshire